Collaboration is an album by jazz trumpeter Shorty Rogers and pianist André Previn, released by RCA Victor in 1955.

Reception

Billboard in 1955 praised the sidemen and added: "The boys turn out some mighty listenable jazz and both Rogers and Previn wear their arranging laurels proudly." AllMusic reviewer Scott Yanow observed: "Shorty Rogers and Andre Previn split the arranging chores in a somewhat competitive fashion. Rogers arranges a standard and then that is followed by a Previn original based on the same chord structure. This procedure is followed until the halfway point of the date when they reverse roles. ...the result is a dead heat with some fine swinging solos".

Track listing 
All compositions by André Previn, except where indicated.
 "It's De-Lovely" (Cole Porter) - 2:28	
 "Porterhouse" - 2:47	
 "Heat Wave" (Irving Berlin) - 2:38	
 "40 Degrees Below" - 2:42	
 "You Stepped Out of a Dream" (Nacio Herb Brown, Gus Kahn) - 2:27	
 "Claudia" - 3:25	
 "You Do Something to Me" (Porter) - 3:07	
 "Call for Cole" (Shorty Rogers) - 2:18	
 "Everything I've Got (Belongs to You)" (Richard Rodgers, Lorenz Hart) - 3:37	
 "Some Antics" (Shorty Rogers) - 3:23	
 "It Only Happens When I Dance with You" (Berlin) - 3:02	
 "General Cluster" (Shorty Rogers) - 3:00

Recorded at RCA Studios in Hollywood, CA on March 30, 1954 (tracks 3, 5, 9 & 11), June 14, 1954 (tracks 4, 6, 10 & 12) and September 14, 1954 (tracks 1, 2, 7 & 8)

Personnel 
Shorty Rogers - trumpet, arranger
André Previn - piano, arranger
Milt Bernhart - trombone
Bud Shank - alto saxophone, flute
Bob Cooper - tenor saxophone
Jimmy Giuffre -  baritone saxophone
Al Hendrickson  (tracks 3-6 & 9-12), Jack Marshall (tracks 1, 2, 7 & 8) - guitar
Curtis Counce  (tracks 4, 6, 10 & 12), Joe Mondragon (tracks 1-3, 5, 7-9 & 11) - bass 
Shelly Manne - drums

References 

1955 albums
Shorty Rogers albums
André Previn albums
RCA Records albums
Albums arranged by Shorty Rogers